Kusinsky District is an administrative and municipal district (raion), one of the twenty-seven in Chelyabinsk Oblast, Russia. It is located in the northwest of the oblast. Population:  32,738 (2002 Census);  The population of Kusa accounts for 63.9% of the district's total population.

References

Notes

Sources

Districts of Chelyabinsk Oblast